The Thakhek gecko (Gekko thakhekensis) is a species of gecko. It is endemic to Laos.

References

Gekko
Reptiles described in 2014
Endemic fauna of Laos
Reptiles of Laos